North High School (Formerly known as North Phoenix High School) is a high school that forms part of the Phoenix Union High School District in Phoenix, Arizona.

History
North Phoenix High School opened its doors in 1939, becoming the first high school built after George Washington Carver High School, a school that was built for segregation purposes.

Closure 
By 1981, the school's enrollment had fallen to 814. As a result, North High was closed in 1981, and would become one of four schools to close during the 1980s. As a result of the closures, two lawsuits were filed, accusing the Phoenix Union High School District of discriminating against ethnic minorities and low-income students by closing schools in their neighborhoods, in addition to unfair resource allocations. The lawsuits were later consolidated into the Castro v. Phoenix Union High School District lawsuit, in which a federal judge ruled against the school district. That ruling resulted in the reopening of North High, as well as, among other measures, the establishment of magnet programs across the district.

Phoenix Union High School District's website makes no reference to the controversy surrounding the school's closure and eventual reopening, merely stating that the school closed, due to declining enrollment, and later reopened.

Reopening 
The school reopened in 1983, and in 1984, 875 students were enrolled at the school.

Campus 
The school's campus was built using funds from the Works Progress Administration and Public Works Administration, both established as part of the New Deal.

The school is noted for having built-in lockers in the hallways, at a time when every other school within the Phoenix Union High School District has removed theirs. Film and commercial producers have said the school reminds people of a traditional high school.

The school's football field contains lattice tower light poles and a concrete grandstand.

In popular culture 

The 1996 movie No One Would Tell was filmed on the school's campus.

Charles Barkley filmed his "I am not a role model" commercial for Nike at the school's gymnasium.

Notable alumni 

 Rebecca White Berch - Chief Justice, Arizona Supreme Court
 Evelyne Bradley – Former Navajo Nation district judge
 Michael Bruce - Alice Cooper band member, inducted into the Rock N' Roll Hall of Fame in 2010
 Ed Buck – Democratic political activist and fundraiser
 Samuel Burke - CNN Correspondent
 Eldridge Wayne Coleman -Professional Wrestling Champion "Superstar" Billy Graham 
 Joan Ganz Cooney - creator/producer, Sesame Street
 George Flint - football player
 Patrick O. Ford - military war hero
 Beverly Garland - actress
 John Howard Lindauer - Republican candidate for governor of Alaska in 1998
 Dallas Long, Jr. - Olympic Shot Putter
 Wayne Newton - entertainer
 Terry Peder Rasmussen - serial killer
 Meg Sneed - LGBT / Civil Rights Activist
 Alan Williams - NBA basketball player

References

External links
 North High School
 Phoenix Union High School District website
 Arizona Department of Education School Report Card

High schools in Phoenix, Arizona
International Baccalaureate schools in Arizona
Educational institutions established in 1939
Public high schools in Arizona
1939 establishments in Arizona